Barium bromate is a chemical compound composed of the barium ion and the bromate ion, with the chemical formula of Ba(BrO3)2.

Preparation
Barium bromate can be prepared by reacting potassium bromate with barium chloride:

References

 Barium compounds
 Bromates